The Olympic Corrections Center  is located in Jefferson County, west of Olympic National Park. It is within the service area of the Forks, Washington, post office, even though it is not close to that city. It is a minimum security facility. Inmates there often work fighting forest fires during the summer, assisting the Department of Natural Resources in clearing and planting trees.

Speciality Inmate crews supervised by Custody and Corrections Officers also help the local communities by providing yard work at senior centers, paint schools (during summer when the children are absent), and other services in the vicinity of the facility.

On October 31, 2011, authorities at Olympic CC entered into a contract with McDougall & Sons orchard in Quincy, Grant County to use 105 inmates to pick apples for that company. McDougall agreed to pay corrections officials $22.00 per hour per inmate for the labor.

The camp is located in Jefferson County, on Hoh Mainline Road north of Clearwater, Washington.

See also
List of law enforcement agencies in Washington (state)
List of United States state correction agencies
List of U.S. state prisons
List of Washington state prisons

References

External links
Olympic Corrections Center

Buildings and structures in Jefferson County, Washington
Prisons in Washington (state)
1968 establishments in Washington (state)